Cleveland Golf  is owned by SRI Sports Limited, a subsidiary of Sumitomo Rubber Industries Ltd., specializing in golf equipment. Based in Huntington Beach, California, Cleveland Golf began as a company known for producing replicas of classic golf clubs.

The company was founded as the Cleveland Classics by Roger Cleveland in 1979.

In 1990, ski equipment manufacturer Skis Rossignol purchased the company, and the name was changed to Cleveland Golf. Sales continued to grow with clubs such as VAS woods and irons. Later in the decade, Tour Action irons and QuadPro woods were introduced with more classic designs.

Quiksilver, Inc. purchased the assets of Rossignol in 2005 and operated Cleveland Golf until December 2007. At that point, Dunlop Sport purchased Cleveland Golf. Dunlop Sports Co. Ltd. owns and operates several brands around the world, which combine to make it the No. 1 golf club brand and No. 2 golf ball brand in Japan and have a major presence in Europe and North America. In addition to its North American headquarters in Huntington Beach, California, Cleveland Golf has three international affiliates located in Japan, Europe, and Canada, as well as 26 worldwide distributors.

The company was the first to market wedges with multiple bounce options on the sole and individually mill grooves into wedge faces.

References

External links
 

Golf equipment manufacturers
1979 establishments in California
1990 mergers and acquisitions
2005 mergers and acquisitions
2007 mergers and acquisitions
American companies established in 1979
Companies based in Huntington Beach, California
Golf in the United States
Manufacturing companies based in California
Manufacturing companies established in 1979
Products introduced in 1979
Sporting goods manufacturers of the United States
Sumitomo Group